The Madonna Inn is a motel in San Luis Obispo, California. Opened for business in 1958, it quickly became a landmark on the Central Coast of California. It is noted for its unique decor, pink dining room, and themed rooms. It was created by Alex Madonna, a successful construction magnate and entrepreneur (d. April 2004), and his wife Phyllis. The inn includes a restaurant and bakery, and is located on the west side of US Route 101 and situated on the lower eastern portion of Cerro San Luis Obispo.

Description
The property is adorned with a pseudo-Swiss-Alps exterior and lavish common rooms accented by pink roses, Western murals, and hammered copper. The predominant exterior color is pink, which extends to the lamp posts and trash cans. Each of the 110 guest rooms and suites is uniquely designed and themed, though some tourists stop just to peek at the famous rock waterfall urinal located in the men's restroom, a feature designed by Hollywood set designer Harvey Allen Warren.

A  boulder is shared as a fireplace for the adjoining Madonna (#141) and Old World (#192) suites.

In 1973, there were five buildings on the  site:

Notes

Aiming to cater to a range of tastes, rooms were given unusual names, amenities, and themes such as "Yahoo" (#132), "Love Nest" (#183), "Old Mill" (#206), "Kona Rock" (#131), "Irish Hills" (#156), "Cloud Nine" (#161), "Just Heaven" (#184), "Hearts & Flowers" (#155), "Rock Bottom" (#143), "Austrian Suite" (#160), "Cabin Still" (#133), "Old World Suite" (#192), "Caveman Room" (#137), "Elegance" (#201), "Daisy Mae" (#138), "Safari Room" (#193), "Highway Suite" (#145), "Jungle Rock" (#139), "American Home" (#204), "Bridal Falls" (#140), and "the Carin" (#218). Some rooms are grouped in themes. For example, the rooms "Ren" (#167), "Dez" (#168), and "Vous" (#169) are a play on the French word rendezvous, and "Merry" (#164), "Go" (#165), and "Round" (#166), for an amusement park carousel. Most of the themes were conceived by Alex and Phyllis Madonna, and some rooms were designed by Disney artist Alice Turney Williams.

History 
The Madonna Inn opened as a motel inn on December 24, 1958 upon the completion of its first twelve rooms. The Madonnas were so excited to have their first guest, they refunded his $7 room rental. Demand was sufficient to expand to forty rooms in 1959, and the Inn facility was constructed in 1960. Reportedly, when the architect Richard Neutra stayed at the Inn, he asked Alex Madonna about the design: "Alex, you didn't have an architect here, did you? It's just as well you didn't because you couldn't have captured all the details if you had to draw them out. I don't know how you would draw these things and then accomplish them."

In May 1966, the Inn's original units were burned to the ground in a fire. It reopened a year later, and by the end of the decade, all of the rooms had been rebuilt in manner for which they are known today. There are 110 rooms.

In 1975, critic Paul Goldberger wrote an article about the Madonna Inn for The New York Times, bringing it to national prominence. By 1982, the Madonna Inn was already well-known, and Alex Madonna was quoted as saying, "Anybody can build one room and a thousand like it. It's more economical. Most places try to give you as little as possible. I try to give people a decent place to stay where they receive more than they are entitled to for what they're paying. I want people to come in with a smile and leave with a smile. It's fun."

Hanna-Barbera Productions sued the Madonna Inn in 1983, alleging copyright infringement over the Inn's "Flintstone Room" (#139) and its decorations, which included images of Fred and Wilma Flintstone and the exclamation "Yabba Dabba Doo". Room #139 is now the "Jungle Rock" junior suite. According to a 2013 interview with Clint Pearce, president of Madonna Enterprises, the "Caveman Room" (#137) was originally the "Flintstone Room".

In popular culture

Film
 The "Rigoletto" segment of the movie Aria (1987) was shot around the hotel.

Television
 A 1994 episode of The Simpsons entitled "Grampa vs. Sexual Inadequacy" features a hotel based on the Madonna Inn, which, among other similarities, also contains a Caveman Room.
 In the season 14 episode of ABC's reality series The Bachelor that aired on January 25, 2010, pilot Jake Pavelka and the nine remaining women take a road trip up the California coast, visit the Oceano Dunes, and stay overnight at the Madonna Inn.
 In the season 5 episode of The Girls Next Door, "Happy Birthday, Anastasia", the girls take a road trip to the Madonna Inn. Featured in the episode are the Madonna Suite and the Old Mill room, as well as Alex Madonna's Gold Rush Steakhouse.

Music
 "Weird Al" Yankovic's 1978 song "Take Me Down" mentions the Madonna Inn's famous urinal (erroneously referred to as "toilets"), as well as other local landmarks such as Pismo Beach, Hearst Castle, Bubblegum Alley, and Morro Rock.
 Roxette filmed the video for their 2001 single "The Centre of the Heart", directed by Jonas Åkerlund.
 The music video for Foxes' song "Echo" (2012) was filmed there.
 The music video for Foxygen's 2013 song "San Francisco" was filmed in the Love Nest.
 The music video for Grimes' 2015 song "Flesh Without Blood/Life in the Vivid Dream" was filmed there.
 The music video for Hey Violet's song "Guys My Age" (2016) was filmed there.
 The promotional video for Lady Antebellum's seventh album Heart Break (2017) was filmed there, with unique rooms at the inn being used as a different theme for each song on the album.

Image gallery

See also 

 City of San Luis Obispo Historic Resources
 List of motels
 Motel Inn, San Luis Obispo

References

Further reading

External links

 

Buildings and structures in San Luis Obispo, California
Companies based in San Luis Obispo County, California
Hotels established in 1958
Hotels in California
Motels in the United States
Novelty buildings in California
Tourist attractions in San Luis Obispo County, California
1958 establishments in California